John Lowther may refer to: 

Sir John Lowther of Lowther Hall (died 1637), Member of Parliament for Westmorland (UK Parliament constituency)
Sir John Lowther, 1st Baronet, of Lowther (1605–1675),  Member of Parliament for Westmorland 1660–1661
John Lowther (d. 1668) (c. 1628 – 1668), Member of Parliament for Appleby 1661–1668
Sir John Lowther, 2nd Baronet, of Whitehaven (1643–1706), Member of Parliament for Cumberland 1665–1701
John Lowther, 1st Viscount Lonsdale (1655–1700),  Member of Parliament for Westmorland 1677–1679 and 1681–1696
John Lowther (d. 1729), Member of Parliament for Pontefract 1722–1729
Sir John Lowther, 1st Baronet, of Swillington (1759–1844), Member of Parliament for Carlisle, Cockermouth, Cumberland, and Haslemere
Sir John Lowther, 2nd Baronet, of Swillington (1793–1868), Member of Parliament for Cockermouth, Wigtown, and York
John Luke Lowther, (1923–2011), soldier, politician and Lord Lieutenant of Northamptonshire